Chan Lam Hams (born 13 May 1955) is a former cyclist from Hong Kong.  He competed in the individual road race and team time trial events at the 1976 Summer Olympics.

References

External links
 

1955 births
Living people
Hong Kong male cyclists
Olympic cyclists of Hong Kong
Cyclists at the 1976 Summer Olympics
Place of birth missing (living people)
Cyclists at the 1978 Asian Games
Asian Games competitors for Hong Kong